Brian Tse Tung-man (born 6 December 1985) is a Hong Kong actor and singer. In 2010, he was a contestant on the second season of TVB's The Voice. Tse was the last contestant eliminated. He subsequently signed a management contract with TVB.

Filmography

Television dramas

Other appearances

References

External links
Official TVB Blog

Living people
1985 births
Hong Kong male television actors
TVB actors
Hong Kong male singers
Cantopop singers
21st-century Hong Kong male actors